Musa Qayeh-ye Abu ol Hasan (also Romanized as Mūsá Qayeh-ye Abū ol Ḩasan; also known as Mūsá Qayeh) is a village in Ujan-e Gharbi Rural District, in the Central District of Bostanabad County, East Azerbaijan Province, Iran. At the 2006 census, its population was 218, in 39 families.

References 

Populated places in Bostanabad County